The 20th South East Asian Junior and Cadet Table Tennis Championships 2014 were held in Bandar Seri Begawan, Brunei.

Medal summary

Events

Medal table

See also

2014 World Junior Table Tennis Championships
2014 Asian Junior and Cadet Table Tennis Championships
Asian Table Tennis Union

References

South East Asian Table Tennis Championships
South East Asian Junior and Cadet Table Tennis Championships
South East Asian Junior and Cadet Table Tennis Championships
South East Asian Junior and Cadet Table Tennis Championships
Table tennis in Brunei
International sports competitions hosted by Brunei
South East Asian Junior and Cadet Table Tennis Championships